The 1922–23 season was Liverpool's 27th season in existence, they went on to retain the title, it was their fourth league title overall. The club also reached the third round of the FA Cup before being knocked out 2–1 by Sheffield United.

References 

1922-23
Liverpool
English football championship-winning seasons